Vaquera may refer to:

Doma vaquera, horse riding technique
Carlos Vaquera (born 1962), Spanish magician
Vaquera (fashion brand), American fashion company